Omar Tayara Rodríguez (born August 13, 1979 in Madrid) is a Spanish-born aquathlete and triathlete, who trains and holds a dual citizenship with Syria.

Tayara started out his triathlon career in 2001, and first competed at the 2002 ITU Triathlon European Cup in Palermo, Italy, with a fair performance. He eventually made his international debut at the 2004 ITU World Cup in his home turf, followed by his other sporting appearances in Cancun and in Hamburg. While competing for Spain, Tayara had won the ITU Aquathlon World Championships in Lausanne, Switzerland, and achieved a third-place finish at the Pan American Cup in Roatán, Honduras. In 2006, Tayara officially gained his Syrian citizenship, which made him eligible to compete in Asian Cup and International Triathlon Union championships under his new nation.

While competing for Syria, Tayara had achieved top six finishes in two Asian cups, and held Olympic qualifying points. He was selected for the national team to compete for the men's triathlon at the 2008 Summer Olympics in Beijing. Tayara also improved his performance in all three phases, most particularly with the cycling phase, in which he struggled before; however, he was not sufficiently enough to keep up his pace, as he finished only in forty-ninth place, with a time of 1:56:40.

Owner and founder of taymory brand in 2010

References

External links
Official Site
ITU Profile

1979 births
Living people
Triathletes at the 2008 Summer Olympics
Olympic triathletes of Syria
Sportspeople from Madrid
Syrian male triathletes
Spanish male triathletes